Invincible is a 2001 drama film written and directed by Werner Herzog. The film stars Tim Roth, Jouko Ahola, Anna Gourari, and Max Raabe. The film tells the story of a Jewish strongman in Germany. While basing his story on the real-life figure Zishe Breitbart (a.k.a. Siegmund Breitbart), Herzog uses the bare facts of Breitbart's life to weave fact and fiction (e.g., the story is set in 1932 Berlin, a full seven years after Breitbart's death in 1925) to create an allegory of human strength, knowing oneself with honesty and pride in one's heritage.

The film features an original score composed by German composer Hans Zimmer, co-written with fellow composer Klaus Badelt. Along with films like The Pledge (also co-written with Zimmer) this marks one of the first projects of Badelt in the feature film industry, and one of several collaborations with Herzog as well.

Plot 
Zishe Breitbart (Jouko Ahola) is the son of an Orthodox Jewish blacksmith in rural Poland. He is fantastically strong, largely from working at hard labour all day. A talent agent sees how strong Breitbart is in his Jewish shtetl home and convinces him to move to Berlin, where he can find work as a strongman.

Hanussen (an allusion to the real-life figure Erik Jan Hanussen, played by Tim Roth), an epic con-man and supposed mystic, runs a cabaret variety show. Hanussen gives Breitbart a blonde wig and a Nordic helmet and calls him "Siegfried" so as to identify him with the Aryan notion of physical superiority. This appeals to the largely Nazi clientele, and he is a big hit.

This is a dark comedy but is equally a deeply dramatic story, involving the mainly secular Jews of Berlin.  Included is interaction between Breitbart, an attractive stage musician Marta, their boss Hanussen, who abuses her, and some very top level Nazis.  Ultimately Breitbart becomes disgusted and dismayed.

A visit from Breitbart's young brother, Benjamin (Jacob Benjamin Wein), convinces Breitbart to be proud of his Jewish heritage, and so, without warning, he takes off the blonde wig in the middle of his act to announce that he is not an "Aryan", and calls himself a new Jewish Samson. This has the effect of making him a hero to the local Jews, who flock to the cabaret to see their new Samson. The Nazis aren't as pleased, and Hanussen tries to discredit Breitbart. He tries to make it seem that it was his mystic powers that were the true strength behind the strongman, and makes it look as though even his frail female pianist Marta can break chains and lift weights if under his power.

Hanussen knows the Nazis dabble in the occult and hopes to become a part of Hitler's future government. He therefore hobnobs with the likes of Himmler and Goebbels. In the end, however, he is exposed as a Czech Jewish con artist named Herschel Steinschneider. As a result, Hanussen is kidnapped and murdered by the Brownshirts. Breitbart foresees what will be known as the Holocaust and returns to Poland to warn the Jewish people of its coming. Unfortunately, no one believes him and he accidentally dies from an infected wound, according to the final titles, two days before Hitler takes power in 1933. In the final scene he is in a delirium as a result of the infection. In a dreamscape surrounded by Christmas Island red crabs, he has a vision of his younger brother Benjamin flying safely away from the looming Holocaust.

Cast
 Jouko Ahola –  Zishe Breitbart.  A Jewish strongman who works in a Berlin occult cabaret. The character is based loosely on Zishe Breitbart.
 Tim Roth – Hanussen. The owner and star attraction of the cabaret. He is based on Erik Jan Hanussen. 
 Anna Gourari – Marta Farra . A pianist and Hanussen's mistress.
 Silvia Vas (de) – Mrs. Holle
 Udo Kier – Count Helldorf

Critical reception
Invincible received mixed reviews during its North American theatrical run. On one end of the spectrum, Roger Ebert said it was one of the best movies of the year:

Watching Invincible was a singular experience for me, because it reminded me of the fundamental power that the cinema had for us when we were children. The film exercises the power that fable has for the believing. Herzog has gotten outside the constraints and conventions of ordinary narrative, and addresses us where our credulity keeps its secrets.

On the syndicated television show Ebert & Roeper, Ebert's co-host Richard Roeper was also enthusiastic, calling the film, "A tremendous piece of work."

David Stratton described it as an uninteresting and overly-long take on a fascinating period of 20th century history. However he did appreciate the production values, which were "solid", and the film had a "predictably rich" music soundtrack.

As of 24 August 2010, the film has a score of 53% on Rotten Tomatoes.

Box office
Invincible opened in North America on 20 September 2002 in 4 theatres, grossing US$14,293 ($3,573 per screen) in its opening weekend, ranking 85th for the weekend. At its widest point, it played in only 9 theatres, and its total gross is US$81,954. It was only in theatrical release for 35 days.

References

External links

Letter to N.Y. Times regarding the facts of Breitbart's final confrontation with Hanussen

2001 films
2001 drama films
German drama films
Irish drama films
American drama films
British drama films
English-language German films
English-language Irish films
Films set in Berlin
Films set in 1932
Films directed by Werner Herzog
Films scored by Hans Zimmer
Films scored by Klaus Badelt
2000s American films
2000s British films
2000s German films